Red Hat, an IBM subsidiary specializing in computer software, offers different level of certification programs, most of which specialize in system administration. Certifications can be validated through Red Hat webpage, and expire after 3 years.

Certifications

Red Hat Certified System Administrator (RHCSA) 
RHCSA is an entry-level certification that focuses on competencies at system administration, including installation and configuration of a Red Hat Enterprise Linux system and attach it to a live network running network services.

To achieve the RHCSA certification the student must pass EX200, a 3-hour hands-on lab exam. The minimum passing score for the exam is 210 out of 300 possible points (70%). There is no prerequisite for the exam, but Red Hat recommends preparing for the exam by taking courses in Red Hat System Administration (RH124 and RH134) if one does not have previous experience.

RHCSA was launched in 2002 as Red Hat Certified Technician (RHCT). As of July 2009 there were 30,000 RHCTs. In November 2010 it was renamed to RHCSA.

Red Hat Certified Engineer (RHCE) 
Self-titled "the flagship" certification, RHCE is a mid- to advanced-level certification that builds on topics covered in the RHCSA certification to include more advanced topics such as security and installing common enterprise networking (IP) services. The certification has a heavy focus on automation using Ansible.
To achieve the RHCE certification, the student must pass the RHCSA exam, EX200, and in addition EX300, a 3.5-hour hands-on lab exam.  Red Hat recommends preparing for the exam by taking courses in Linux essentials (RH124), Linux administration (RH134), and Linux networking and security (RH254) if one does not have previous experience. Previous real-world experience is also advised.

RHCE was the first Red Hat certificate launched, in 1999. As of July 2009 there were 40,000 RHCEs. It was named the Hottest Certification for 2006 by CertCities.com.

Red Hat Certified Architect (RHCA) 
Self-titled "the capstone certificate", RHCA is the most complete certificate in the program, adding an enterprise-level focus.

There are concentrations inside the RHCA on which a candidate may choose to focus, however choosing to do so is not required. The focuses are:

 Datacenter: skills with tasks common in an on-premises datacenter
 Cloud: skills with tasks common to cloud infrastructure
 Devops: skills and knowledge in technologies and practices that can accelerate the process of moving applications and updates from development through the build and test processes and on to production
 Application Development: skills in enterprise application development, integration, and architecture
 Application Platform: skills with tasks common for building and managing tools and applications

RHCA was launched in 2005.

Red Hat Certified Virtualization Administrator (RHCVA) 
RHCVA is a certification that focuses on Virtualization administration.
To achieve the RHCVA certification the student must pass EX318, a 3-hour hands-on lab exam. There is no prerequisite for the exam, but Red Hat recommends preparing for the exam by taking the respective course, RH318, and by obtaining the RHCSA certification described above. The exam also requires knowledge in using and installing Microsoft Windows operating systems.

RHCVA was Launched in November 2009.

JBoss Certified Application Administrator (JBCAA) 
JBCAA is a certification that focuses on managing the JBoss Enterprise Application Platform.
To achieve the JBCAA certification the student must pass EX248, a four-hour hands-on lab exam. There is no prerequisite for the exam, but Red Hat recommends preparing for the exam by taking course JB248, a four-day course in JBoss application administration.

JBCAA was Launched in September 2009.

Examination required for each certification

See also 
 CompTIA Linux+
 Linux Professional Institute certifications
 Ubuntu Professional Certification

References 
 21. Ethical hacking CEH V10 program

Further reading

External links 
 Red Hat Certification Program
 List of Red Hat Courses

Information technology qualifications
Red Hat